The China National Baseball League (CNBL) is a professional baseball league founded in 2019.

History

The original Chinese Baseball League (CBL) was founded in 2002. The league suspended operations in 2012 due to financial troubles after the 2011 season, but returned in 2014. The league closed permanently in 2016. The original league was the final in 2018 season and discontinued operating league.

On August 16, 2019, the league announced that Major League Baseball signed an agreement with the Chinese Baseball Association to help with a revamp of the league.

Teams

League Champions

Past Results

Performance by Clubs

See also
 China Baseball League

References

External links

Baseball leagues in Asia
Baseball in China
2019 establishments in China
Sports leagues established in 2019
Professional sports leagues in China